Mycorrhaphium sessile is a species of tooth fungus in the family Steccherinaceae that is found in China. It was described as a new species in 2009 by mycologists Hai-Sheng Yuan and Yu-Cheng Dai. The type collection was made in Yunnan, where it was found fruiting on a fallen branch.

References

Steccherinaceae
Fungi of China
Fungi described in 1989
Taxa named by Yu-Cheng Dai